Brian Ross Dansel (born April 2, 1983) is an American politician, political advisor, and current head of Washington state's Farm Service Agency. Before that he served as a Special Assistant to the United States Secretary of Agriculture in the administration of Donald Trump. He was previously a Republican member of the Washington State Senate from the 7th Legislative District. Dansel won the seat in the 2013 election, in which he defeated appointed senator John Smith, and was sworn in on December 6, 2013.

In a letter to the Washington State Office of Governor dated January 24, 2017, Dansel resigned as senator for the seventh district and vacated his seat after accepting a position with the Trump Administration as a Special Assistant to the Secretary of Agriculture. In early November, he returned to Washington state to be the director of the state's USDA Farm Service Agency.

Awards 
 2014 Guardians of Small Business award. Presented by NFIB.

References

Republican Party Washington (state) state senators
Living people
1983 births
People from Ferry County, Washington
21st-century American politicians
Trump administration personnel